Durango is a 1999 made-for-television drama film directed by Brent Shields, starring Matt Keeslar and Patrick Bergin. The journey of young Irishman Mark Doran (Matt Keeslar), a cattle farmer who decides to walk  with his cows to the village of Trallock to get a fair price for his herd rather than sell.

Cast
 Matt Keeslar as Mark Doran
 Patrick Bergin as Fergus Mullaney
 George Hearn as Rector
 Brenda Fricker as Aunt Maeve
 Nancy St. Alban as Annie Mullaney
 Dermot Martin as Jay Mullaney
 Paul Ronan as Tom Mullaney
 Eamon Morrissey as Philly Hinds
 Mark Lambert as Algie Clawhammer
 Ian McElhinney as Vestor McCarthy
 Pat Laffan as Bill Gobberley

References

External links 
 
 
 

1999 television films
1999 films
Films set in Ireland
Films set in 1939
1999 drama films
Films with screenplays by Walter Bernstein
Hallmark Hall of Fame episodes
American drama television films
1990s English-language films
1990s American films